The Men's 100+ kg Judo competition at the 2008 Summer Olympics was held on August 15 at the Beijing Science and Technology University Gymnasium.
Preliminary rounds started at 12:00 Noon CST.
Repechage finals, semifinals, bouts for bronze medals and the final were held at 18:00pm CST.

This event was the heaviest of the men's judo weight classes, allowing competitors with over 100 kilograms of body mass. Like all other judo events, bouts lasted five minutes. If the bout was still tied at the end, it was extended for another five-minute, sudden-death period; if neither judoka scored during that period, the match is decided by the judges. The tournament bracket consisted of a single-elimination contest culminating in a gold medal match. There was also a repechage to determine the winners of the two bronze medals. Each judoka who had lost to a semifinalist competed in the repechage. The two judokas who lost in the semifinals faced the winner of the opposite half of the bracket's repechage in bronze medal bouts.

In this competition, the heaviest athlete of the Games, Ricardo Blas Jr., competed with a body weight of 210 kg. Despite his huge body, he was thrown away by his opponent in the first round, eliminating him from the tournament.

Qualifying athletes

Tournament results

Final

Mat 1

Mat 2

Repechage

References

 Competition format

External links
 

M101
Judo at the Summer Olympics Men's Heavyweight
Men's events at the 2008 Summer Olympics